Pekka Säilä (20 December 1941 – 7 December 2009) was a tennis player from Finland.

Tennis career
Säilä made his debut for the Finland Davis Cup team during the 1962 Europe Zone second round tie against Czechoslovakia. During his sixteen-year Davis Cup career, he played in twenty-three Davis Cup singles rubbers, seven of which he won, and he also played in thirteen doubles rubbers, with two wins.

During 1967, Säilä was recruited to attend college in the United States at Oral Roberts University in Tulsa, Oklahoma. He played for the university tennis team and graduated in 1970.

Säilä participated at the Wimbledon Championships on two occasions, with a best result of reaching the third round in 1967, before losing to the British player, Roger Taylor.

See also
List of Finland Davis Cup team representatives

References

External links
 
 
 

1941 births
2009 deaths
Finnish male tennis players
Sportspeople from Helsinki
Oral Roberts Golden Eagles
College men's tennis players in the United States